Serge Constantine Lazareff  (7 August 1944 - 20 August 2021) was an Australian actor and screenwriter/editor, who was born in Shanghai, China. He appeared in 54 roles from the late 1960s until 1999, before starting a second career as a writer for TV series.

Acting
Lazareff performed in many Australian television series from the late 1960s to the late 1990s and made numerous appearances in Crawford Productions police shows including The Sullivans, Homicide, Division 4, Matlock Police and Chopper Squad. He had a featured part in the 1970 ABC-TV drama series Dynasty. Lazareff also appeared in the 1970s historical adventure series Cash & Co.; 

Lazareff is probably best remembered by Australian audiences for his role in the 1970s TV drama Young Ramsay, in which he starred alongside friend and co-star John Hargreaves.

He also appeared in The Young Doctors (playing fake Dr Ian Parish, really called Jack Trainer), Glenview High, Prisoner (as teacher David Andrews during episodes aired in 1981), Cop Shop, Bellamy, Carson's Law, A Country Practice, Special Squad, Sons and Daughters, Richmond Hill (as Neil Travers during 1988) and then E Street (in 1989 as rapist and murderer Sam Bullmer).

Writing

From the late 1980s Lazareff worked primarily as a writer and script editor for TV series including Heartbreak High, Water Rats, All Saints and Home and Away.

Death
Lazareff died in August 2021. He had apparently been ill for some time. Although there were no mainstream media reports, he was included in the 2022 Logie Awards "In Memoriam" montage.

Filmography

References

External links

1944 births
2021 deaths
Australian male film actors
Australian male soap opera actors
Male actors from Shanghai
Chinese emigrants to Australia
20th-century Australian male actors
Australian male television writers
Australian soap opera writers